Vaigai is a 2009 Tamil-language romantic drama film directed by L.R. Sundarapandi. The film stars Bala Joseph and Vishaka, with Sai Kumar, Thalaivasal Vijay, Ganja Karuppu, Thennavan, Shyam Ganesh, Singamuthu, Appukutty, and Ambani Shankar playing supporting roles. The film had musical score by Sabesh–Murali, cinematography by V. Lakshmipathi, and editing by K. M. K. Palanivel. The film released on 10 July 2009.

Plot
In a remote village near Madurai, the happy-go-lucky man Arivu (Bala Joseph) and the village belle Uma (Vishaka) fall in love with each other. Arivu is the son of the village bigwig Mandakalai (Sai Kumar), while Uma is the daughter of the postman Manikkam (Thalaivasal Vijay). When Mandakalai knew about his son's love affair, he sends his cousin Duraisingam (Thennavan) and his henchmen to kill Uma, but Arivu saves her. The lovers consume poison and go separated, getting into different trains moving at opposite directions. Arivu is then admitted to the hospital and saved by the doctors. Mandakalai's henchmen cannot find the missing girl Uma, and the villagers conclude that she died.

The heartbroken Arivu with his friends moves to Chennai to try to forget this mishap. One day, Arivu's friends witness Uma in a temple, but Dr. Shyam (Shyam Ganesh) tells them that she is not Uma, thinking that they might be Mandakalai's henchmen. Uma is now living in Shyam's house but is afraid of returning home, so Shyam invites her parents at his home. When Uma and her parents return to their village, they come to know that Arivu committed suicide. Arivu was moved after the "death" of his lover, but he acted happy and positive to his friends and family. Uma is aghast to hear this news, and she decides to not get married. Every year, at the death anniversary of her lover, Uma places flower garlands at the burial place of Arivu.

Cast

Bala Joseph as Arivu
Vishaka as Uma
Sai Kumar as Mandakalai, Arivu's father
Thalaivasal Vijay as Manikkam, Uma's father
Ganja Karuppu as Jeevarasi
Thennavan as Duraisingam
Shyam Ganesh as Dr. Shyam
Singamuthu as Muthurasu
Appukutty as Kulumai
Shankar
Theni Murugan as Bus Conductor
Rajasekhar
V. M. Subburaj
Chellakoori
Vijay Ganesh
Amirthalingam
Sai Gopi
Yuvan Swang
Madurai Saroja
Anjali Devi
Sujibala in a special appearance
Ragasya in a special appearance

Production

L. R. Sundarapandi made his directorial debut with Vaigai, a film based on some real-life incidents that happened in Madurai which took place in the 1980s. Bala Joseph, the winner of the second season of Maanada Mayilada, was chosen to play the hero while newcomer Vishaka from Kerala was selected to play his love interest. Ganja Karuppu played a major role, and actress Ragasya appeared in an item song sung by actor Silambarasan. The film was shot in Pollachi, Madurai and Chennai. L.R.Sundarapandi's upcoming film is Theerkadarishi starred Ajmal Ameer

Soundtrack

The film score and the soundtrack were composed by Sabesh–Murali. The soundtrack features six tracks with lyrics written by Snehan, Na. Muthukumar, and L. R. Sundarapandi. The audio was released on 26 March 2009 in Chennai and the first copy of the album was received by actress Namitha. Rama Narayanan, Sivasakthi Pandian, M. K. Tamilarasu, and Mohan Raja attended the audio launch.

Release
The film was released on 10 July 2009 alongside four other films.

Critical reception
A reviewer wrote, "Bala makes a perfect debut and is so decent on his take. He never overreacts at any point and so does the female lead Visaka" and cited the film as "worth watching". Another critic said, "The story inspired by a real-life incident has nothing new to offer in terms of the storyline but the director's interesting narration of the subject has made the movie a watchable one".

Box office
The film took a below average opening at the Chennai box office, beginning in the fifth position the first week and finishing in the eighth position the second week.

References

2009 films
2000s Tamil-language films
Indian romantic drama films
2009 romantic drama films